Red Swoosh was a peer-to-peer file sharing company founded by Travis Kalanick and Michael Todd in 2001 and acquired by Akamai Technologies in 2007.  The Red Swoosh technology included a centralized directory that indexed online clients and caches.  The software downloads and sideloads video multicasts from websites that support the Red Swoosh technology. The Red Swoosh peercasting tool is a browser extension that caches data, reflecting and sharing files delivered through the "Swoosh network" or Distributed Network. 

Red Swoosh utilizes a proprietary, peer-to-peer (P2P) file distribution protocol designed for bandwidth efficiency in the transfer of large media files.  

The company offers a software development kit (SDK) for third-party development. This includes support for predelivery, RSS feeds, web widgets, and JavaScript applications. There is also a forum and a wiki available for the developer community.

Acquisition
On April 12, 2007, Red Swoosh was acquired in an all-stock transaction by Akamai Technologies. The acquisition was valued at approximately $19 million (not including earn-outs).

See also
P2PTV

References 

2007 mergers and acquisitions
American companies established in 2001
American companies disestablished in 2007
Computer companies established in 2001
Computer companies disestablished in 2007
Defunct computer companies of the United States
Defunct software companies of the United States
File sharing
Peercasting